This is a list of properties and districts in Evans County, Georgia that are listed on the National Register of Historic Places (NRHP).

Current listings

|}

References

Evans
Buildings and structures in Evans County, Georgia